Hubert Fournier (born 3 September 1967) is a French football manager and former player who most recently managed Lyon. He formerly managed Reims between 2010 and 2014, Gueugnon in 2008 and was an assistant coach at Stade de Reims from 2009 to 2010.

Early life
Hubert Fournier was born on 3 September 1967 in Riom, Puy-de-Dôme.

Managerial career
Under his first season (2010–11), Reims finished Ligue 2 as 10th and reached the quarter-final of the Coupe de France. In the following season (2011–12) Reims finished the Ligue 2 as runner-up and returned to Ligue 1 after 33 years.

On 23 May 2014, Fournier was named new manager of Lyon.

On 23 December 2015, Fournier was dismissed as head coach of Lyon, and replaced by Bruno Génésio.

Managerial statistics

Honours
Individual
Onze d'Or Coach of the Year: 2015

References

External links

1967 births
Living people
People from Riom
Sportspeople from Puy-de-Dôme
Footballers from Auvergne-Rhône-Alpes
French footballers
Association football defenders
INF Vichy players
Stade Malherbe Caen players
En Avant Guingamp players
Borussia Mönchengladbach players
Olympique Lyonnais players
FC Rouen players
Ligue 1 players
Ligue 2 players
Bundesliga players
French football managers
FC Gueugnon managers
Stade de Reims managers
Olympique Lyonnais managers
French expatriate footballers
Expatriate footballers in Germany
French expatriate sportspeople in Germany